Pali literature is concerned mainly with Theravada Buddhism, of which Pali is the traditional language. The earliest and most important Pali literature constitutes the Pāli Canon, the authoritative scriptures of Theravada school. 

Pali literature includes numerous genres, including Suttas (Buddhist discourses), Vinaya (monastic discipline), Abhidhamma (philosophy), poetry, history, philology, hagiography, scriptural exegesis, and meditation manuals.

History 

The Pali language is a composite language which draws on various Middle Indo-Aryan languages. 

Much of the extant Pali literature is from Sri Lanka, which became the headquarters of Theravada for centuries. Most extant Pali literature was written and composed there, though some was also produced in outposts in South India. Most of the oldest collection of Pali Literature, the Pali Canon, was committed to writing in Sri Lanka at about the first century BCE (though it contains material that is much older, possibly dating to the period of pre-sectarian Buddhism).

At around the start of the common era, some of the earliest Pali commentaries and exegetical manuals (which are now sometimes included within the Pali Canon itself) were written, mainly the Suttavibhanga, Niddesa, Nettipakarana and Petakopadesa. Other works like the Cariyapitaka, the Buddhavamsa and the Apadana may also belong to this post-Asokan period. 

During the first millennium, Pali literature consisted of two major genres: histories (vamsa) and commentaries (atthakatha). The histories include the  Dipavamsa and the Mahavamsa, which are verse chronicles of Buddhism in India and Sri Lanka.

The commentarial works include the writings of Buddhaghosa (4th or 5th century CE), who wrote the influential Visuddhimagga along with various commentaries on the Pali Canon. Several other commentators worked after Buddhaghosa, such as Buddhadatta (c. fifth century), Ananda (sixth century), Dhammapala (at some point before the 12th century) and other anonymous commentators which we do not know by name. 

The reform period between the 10th to 13th centuries saw an explosion of new Pali literature. Part of the impulse behind these literary efforts was the fear that warfare on the island could lead to the decline of Buddhism. This literature includes the work of prominent scholars such as Anuruddha, Sumangala, Siddhattha, Sāriputta Thera, Mahākassapa of Dimbulagala and Moggallana Thera.

They worked on compiling subcommentaries to the Tipitaka, grammars, summaries and textbooks on Abhidhamma and Vinaya such as the influential Abhidhammattha-sangaha of Anuruddha. They also wrote kavya style Pali poetry and philological works. Their work owed much to the influence of Sanskrit grammar and poetics, particularly as interpreted by the Sri Lankan scholar Ratnamati. During this period, these new Pali doctrinal works also show an increasing awareness of topics found in Sanskrit Buddhist Mahayana literature.

From the 15th century onwards, Pali literature has been dominated by Burma, though some has also been written in Thailand, Laos and Cambodia, as well as Ceylon.  This Burmese literature has in turn been dominated by writings directly or indirectly concerned with the Abhidhamma Pitaka, the part of the Canon variously described as philosophy, psychology, metaphysics etc.

Canonical Pali Literature

Pali Tipitaka 

The earliest and most important Pali literature constitutes the Pali Tipitaka, the main scripture collection of the Theravada school. These are of Indian origin, and were written down during the reign of Vattagamani Abhaya (29—17 B.C.) in Sri Lanka.

The Tipitaka ("Triple Basket"), also known as Pali Canon, is divided into three "baskets":

 Vinaya Piṭaka (Basket of the Monastic Discipline)
Suttavibhaṅga: Pāṭimokkha (a list of rules for monastics) and commentary
Khandhaka: 22 chapters on various topics
Parivāra: analyses of rules from various points of view
 Sutta Piṭaka (Basket of Sayings/Discourses), mostly ascribed to the Buddha, but some to his disciples.
 Digha Nikāya, the "long" discourses.
 Majjhima Nikāya, the "middle-length" discourses.
 Saṁyutta Nikāya, the "connected" discourses.
 Anguttara Nikāya, the "numerical" discourses.
 Khuddaka Nikāya, the "minor collection".
 Abhidhamma Piṭaka (Basket of Abhidhamma, i.e. Philosophical Psychology). According to K.R. Norman, "It is clear that the Abhidhamma is later than the rest of the canon."
 Dhammasaṅganī
 Vibhaṅga
 Dhātukathā
  Puggalapaññatti
 Kathāvatthu
 Yamaka
 Paṭṭhāna

Early Post-Canonical Texts 
These are early works written after the closure of the canon. The first four of these texts are present in the Khuddaka Nikaya of the Burmese Tipitaka but not in the Thai or Sri Lankan. They are also not mentioned by Buddhaghosa as being part of the canon.

 Suttasaṃgaha - A collection of important suttas from the Tipitaka
Nettipakarana - "The Book of Guidance", a work on exegesis and hermeneutics
Petakopadesa - "Instruction on the Pitaka", another text on exegesis and hermeneutics
 Milindapañha - The Questions of King Milinda. A dialogue between a monk and an Indo-Greek king.
Vimuttimagga - A short practice manual by Upatissa (possibly 1st century CE), the Pali text is now lost, and only the Chinese translation survives.

Pali texts composed in Sri Lanka

Commentaries 
A collection of Pali Commentaries (Atthakatha) were written in Sri Lanka by various (some anonymous) authors, such as Buddhagosa, Dhammapala, Mahanama, Upasena, and Buddhadatta. Buddhagosa writes that he based his commentaries on older works which were brought to Sri Lanka when Buddhism first arrived there, and were translated into Sinhalese. K.R. Norman has written that there is evidence that some parts of the commentaries are very old.

Sub-commentaries 
Sub-commentarial works called Tikas are secondary commentaries, that is to say, commentaries on the Atthakathas. Dhammapala is one early author of tikas. He is particularly known for his Paramatthamañjusa, a sub-commentary on the Visuddhimagga.

Doctrinal Manuals, Summaries and Treatises 
Visuddhimagga - Buddhaghosa, A very influential compendium of Buddhist doctrine and practice by Buddhagosa (5th century).
Abhidhammavatara - Buddhadatta, The earliest effort at an introductory manual which summarizes the doctrines in the Abhidhamma (5th century)
Ruparupa-vibhaga - Buddhadatta - A short manual on Abhidhamma (5th century)
Saccasankhepa - Culla-Dhammapala, "Elements of Truth", A "short treatise on Abhidhamma" (7th century)
Abhidhammattha-sangaha - Acariya Anuruddha, A summary of the Abhidhamma, widely used as an introductory Abhidhamma text, c. 11th to 12th century.
Namarupa-pariccheda - Acariya Anuruddha,  A verse introduction to the Abhidhamma
Paramattha-vinicchaya - attributed to Acariya Anuruddha, K.R. Norman thinks this might be a different Anuruddha.
Khemappakarana - By the nun Khema, A "short manual on the Abhidhamma"
Mohavicchedani - Mahakassapa of Chola, A guide to the matikas (topics) of the seven books of the Abhidhamma (12th century)
Nāmacāradīpikā - Chappata, (15th century)
Vinayavinicchaya - Buddhadatta,  A verse summary of the first four books of the Vinaya (5th century)
Uttaravinicchaya - Buddhadatta,  A verse summary of the Parivara, the final book of the Vinaya (5th century)
Khuddasikkha and Mulasikkha - Short summaries on monastic discipline.
Upasaka-janalankara - Sihala Acariya Ananda Mahathera, a manual on the Buddha's teachings for lay disciples (Upasakas) (13th century)
Simalankara, a work dealing with monastic boundaries (sima)
Bhesajjamanjusa - a Medical text from Sri Lanka (13th century)
Yogāvacara's manual - Sri Lankan meditation manual (c. 16th-17th century) of Esoteric Theravada (Borān-kammaṭṭhāna).
Amatākaravaṇṇanā (c. 18th century) - According to Kate Crosby, this is one of the most extensive manuals of Esoteric Theravada meditation and was compiled by Kandyan Sinhalese students of Thai esoteric meditation masters.

Historical Chronicles 
The following include various Buddhist historical chronicles (vamsa):
Dipavamsa - "The Island Chronicle" (4th century)
Mahavamsa - "The Great Chronicle" (6th century) by Mahanama
A Cambodian Mahavamsa, almost twice the length of the original, and including numerous additions.
Culavamsa - "The Lesser Chronicle"
Vamsatthappakasini, a commentary of the Mahavamsa (6th century)
Thupavamsa by Vacissara, a chronicle of the Great Stupa in Anuradhapura (12th century)
Dathavamsa by Dhammakitti, a chronicle of Buddhist history, focusing on relics, such as the tooth relic
Samantakutavannana - Vedehathera, A poem in 796 stanzas on the Buddha's life and his visits to Sri Lanka.
Hatthavanagalla-viharavamsa - Life story of the Sinhala Buddhist king Sirisanghabodhi (r. 247-249) (13th century)
Lokapaññatti, a work on Buddhist cosmology, mostly borrowed from the Sanskrit Lokaprajñapti.
Saddhamma-sangaha - Dhammakitti Mahasami, Literary and ecclesiastical history of Buddhism (14th century)
Cha-kesadhatuvamsa - A history of the six stupas that enshrine the hair relics of the Buddha. (14th century)
Saddhammasangaha, which contains details about Buddhist texts and their authors.
Sandesakatha - 19th century

Poetry (mostly hagiographical) 
Most Sinhalese Pali poetry is in kavya style, with much Sanskritic influence. 

Mahabodhivamsa by Upatissa, a historical poem focusing on the bodhi tree (10th century)
Telakaṭāhagāthā - "The Oil-Cauldron Verses.", Collection of Sri Lankan poems from a monk thrown into boiling oil
Jinalankara - Buddharakkhita, 278 verse poem on the life of the Buddha (12th century)
Anagata-vamsa - Mahakassapa of Cola, Story of Maitreya, the next Buddha (12th century)
Dasabodhisattuppattikatha - Birth Stories of the Ten Bodhisattas
Dasabodhisattuddesa - Another collection of birth stories
Jinacarita - Medhankara, 472 verse poem on the life of the Buddha (13th century)
Pajjamadhu - Buddhapiya Dipankara (13th century), poem on the beauty of the Buddha
Samantakutavannana by Vedeha (13th century), a life story of the Bodhisatta Siddhattha
Pañcagatidipana - A poem that describes the five forms of rebirth
Saddhammopayana - 629 short verses in praise of the Dhamma
Jinavamsadipani - Moratuve Medhananda Thera, An epic poem on the life of the Buddha & his teachings in 2000 verses (1917)
Mahakassapacarita - Widurapola Piyatissa, 1500 verse poem on the life of Mahakasyapa (1934)

Edifying tales 
A genre which consists of stories in mixed prose and verse, often focusing on the advantages of giving (dana).

 Dasavatthuppakarana
 Sihalavatthuppakarana
 Sahassavatthuppakarana
 Rasavahini

Linguistic works 
Works on Pali language, mostly grammar.
 Kaccāyana-vyākarana, Date is unknown but after Buddhaghosa. It's the earliest and most influential grammar of Pali.
Nyasa, or Mukhamattadipani by Vimalabuddhi (11th century), a commentary on Kaccayana's Grammar.
Suttaniddesa or Nyasapradipa by Chapata or Saddhammajoti-pala
Kaccayana-sara, ab abridgement of Kaccayana's Grammar written by Dhammananda
Rupasiddhi, a re-arrangement of Kaccāyana-vyākarana
Balavatara, a re-arrangement of Kaccāyana-vyākarana
Moggallayana-vyakarana a.k.a. Saddalakkhana, and the auto-commentary Moggallayanapañcika is a new Pali grammar by Moggallana who created a new school of grammar c. 12th century.
Abhidhanappadipika, a Pali dictionary

Poetics and Prosody 
Works on poetics and prosody.

 Subodhalankara of Sangharakkhita (12th century), a work on poetics
 Vuttodaya, a work on Pali meter by Sangharakkhita
 Sambandhacinta by Sangharakkhita, a work on verbs and syntax

Non-canonical Jataka collections 
These are jataka collections that are outside of the Pali Canon:

 Paññasa-jataka
 Sudhanukumara jataka
 Kosala-bimba-vannana, a story told in Jataka style about Buddha statues

Anthologies 
Anthologies of various texts on different topics:

Mahaparitta - A small collection of texts taken from the Suttapitaka
Suttasamgaha - A selection of texts from the Tripitaka
Sarasangaha - Siddhattha, A "manual of Dhamma" in prose and verse (13th century)
Upasakajanalankara

Burmese Pali literature 

 Dhammasattha - A Southeast Asian genre of Buddhist law
Dhammaniti, Lokaniti, Maharahaniti, and Rajaniti, collections of aphorisms of worldly wisdom (niti).
Saddanīti, by Aggavaṃsa of Arimaddana, an influential Pali grammar; Burma (c. 1154 CE). K.R. Norman calls it "the greatest of extant Pali grammars." It draws on Kaccayana and Panini.
 Buddhaghosuppatti - Mahāmaṅgala, Story of Buddhagosa (Burma, 15th century)
Braḥ Māleyyadevattheravatthuṃ - A narrative of the travels of the monk Māleyyadev
Gandhavamsa - Catalog of ancient Buddhist commentators (19th century).
Sāsanavaṃsa, written in 1861 by Paññasami, a history of Buddhism, including Burmese Buddhism.
Sandesakatha (19th century)
Sima-vivada-vinichaya-katha (19th century)
 Visuddhiñana-katha (The Progress of Insight) by Mahasi Sayadaw, originally in Burmese, translated to Pali (1950).

Thai Pali literature 

Cakkavaladipani, a work on cosmology, c. 1520.
Jinakalamali - A Thai Buddhist Chronicle, by a Thai elder named Ratapañña (16th century)
Sangitivamsa - A Thai Chronicle, focusing on the various Buddhist councils (sangiti) from the 18th century

See also 
 Early Buddhist Texts
 Pāli Canon
 Sutta Piṭaka
 Vinaya Piṭaka
 Abhidhamma Piṭaka
 Anupitaka
 Pali Text Society
 Palm-leaf manuscript
 List of Pali Canon anthologies
 List of suttas

External links 

 Bhikkhu Nyanatusita Comprehensive Reference Table of Pali Literature 
 Large collection of Pali literature in the original 
 huge collection of canonical and post-canonical pali literature, some of the texts absent at tipitaka.org
 John Bullitt (2002)"Beyond the Tipitaka: A Field Guide to Post-canonical Pali Literature,"
 List of texts in Pāli  by the Pali Text Society.

Further reading 
 Bode, Mabel Haynes The Pali Literature of Burma, Royal Asiatic Society, London, 1909.
 Collins, Steven Nirvana and other Buddhist Felicities: Utopias of the Pali imaginaire, Cambridge University Press, 1998 (paperback edition 2006).
 Norman, K.R. Pali Literature, Otto Harrassowitz, Wiesbaden, 1983
 Hinüber, Oscar v. Handbook of Pali Literature, Walter de Gruyter, Berlin, 1996
 Warren (ed & tr), Buddhism in Translations, Harvard University Press, 1896
 Malalasekera, G.P. The Pali Literature of Ceylon, Colombo 1928; Buddhist Publication Society, Kandy, 1994 (see http://www.bps.lk)

 Wallis, Glenn, Buddhavacana: A Pali Reader(Onalaska, Wash: Pariyatti Press, 2011)

References 

 
Formal languages used for Indian scriptures